is a Japanese illustrator, manga artist, and YouTuber. He is a regular contributing artist for the Duel Masters Trading Card Game, the Pokémon Trading Card Game, and Hatsune Miku merchandise. He is also the main illustrator and character designer for the game Dragalia Lost. As a manga artist, he wrote and illustrated Baki Domoe from 2010 to 2014. In addition, Saito runs a YouTube channel offering advice on how to improve artwork and published two books based on its content.

Career

Saito debuted professionally at the age of 19, drawing artwork for the Duel Masters Trading Card Game. He is a regular contributing illustrator for the Pokémon Trading Card Game and the main illustrator for Dragalia Lost. From 2010 to 2014, he wrote and illustrated Baki Domoe, a comedy spin-off of Baki the Grappler. Baki Domoe was first launched on the Weekly Shōnen Champion'''s website, but after it shut down, it was published irregularly in the magazine before being moved to Bessatsu Shōnen Champion.

In 2017, Saito designed a Hatsune Miku figure, which was also re-released in 2019. He provided the illustrations for collaboration merchandise between Monster Hunter Frontier and Hatsune Miku, celebrating the 10th anniversary of both franchises. Saito provided the character design for the manga series Suginami Tōbatsu Kōmuin, which began serialization in Shōnen Jump+ in 2018.

In 2019, Saito became one of the contributing character designers for the mobile app game 47 Heroines. He released a collaboration illustration between Hatsune and Digimon Adventure to celebrate the latter franchise's 20th anniversary. Later that year, Saito created a YouTube channel, where he provided advice and instructional videos on drawing. As of June 2021, he has at least 470,000 subscribers on his YouTube channel. In October 2019, he provided illustrations for Hatsune Miku mug cups that were sold in Sega arcade machines.

In 2021, Saito designed a figure featuring N and Zorua from Pokémon Black and White, as well as Leon and Charizard from Pokémon Sword and Shield. In the same year, Saito released his first advice book, Umaku Kaku no Kinshi: Tsurakunai Irasuto Jōtatsu-hō, on March 22, with contents based on his YouTube channel. This was followed by his second book, Saitō Naoki no Mottainai! Irasuto Tensaku Kōza''. In the same year, Saito also announced he would be selling NFT art, with one of his works selling for 13.69 ETH (equivalent to ).

Personal life

Saito attended and graduated from Tama Art University, where he majored in graphic design.

Works

Manga

Other publications

References

1982 births
Japanese illustrators
Japanese YouTubers
Living people
Manga artists from Yamagata Prefecture
Pokémon
Video bloggers